The Price of Progression is an album released by the Columbus, Ohio rock band, The Toll on November 30, 1988. The album contains nine tracks and the lead vocals done by Brad Circone, the band's lead vocalist.

Track listing
"Jazz Clone Clown" – 4:00
"Jonathan Toledo" – 10:00
"Smoke Another Cigarette" – 4:19
"Soldier's Room" – 3:34
"Word of Honor" – 4:11
"Anna-41-Box" – 10:33
"Tamara Told Me" – 4:32
"Living in the Valley of Pain" – 11:19
"Stand in Winter" – 5:32

All songs written by Brad Circone/Rick Silk/Brett Mayo/Greg Bartram

Personnel
Brad Circone - Vocals, Guitars, Piano
Rick Silk - Guitars, Vocals (background)
Brett Mayo - Drums, Vocals (background)
Greg Bartram - Bass, Vocals (background)
Mick Ronson - Lead Guitar on "Stand in Winter"
Lenny Pickett - Saxophone on "Smoke Another Cigarette"
Michael Barbiero - Producer, Engineer
Steve Thompson - Producer

The Toll albums
1988 albums
Geffen Records albums